Lactifluus hygrophoroides (formerly Lactarius hygrophoroides) is a member of the milk-cap genus Lactifluus in the order Russulales. It was first described scientifically by Miles Joseph Berkeley and Moses Ashley Curtis in 1859 as a species of Lactarius, and was historically known by this name until the systematics of milk-cap species were recently revised. It is a choice edible, although some report its taste to be mild.

See also
 List of Lactifluus species

References

External links
 

hygrophoroides
Edible fungi
Fungi described in 1859
Fungi of North America
Taxa named by Miles Joseph Berkeley